Levin Muller (born 21 September 1998) is a South African cricketer. He made his List A debut on 28 February 2021, for South Western Districts in the 2020–21 CSA Provincial One-Day Challenge.

References

External links
 

1998 births
Living people
South African cricketers
South Western Districts cricketers
Place of birth missing (living people)